City FM 105.1 is an urban music radio station located in Lateef Jakande Road, Agidigbi,  Ikeja, Lagos.

References 

Radio stations in Lagos